Huntington Township is one of the eighteen townships of Lorain County, Ohio, United States.  As of the 2010 census, the population was 1,341.

Geography
Located in southeastern Lorain County, it borders the following townships:
Wellington Township - north
Penfield Township - northeast corner
Spencer Township, Medina County - east
Homer Township, Medina County - southeast corner
Sullivan Township, Ashland County - south
Troy Township, Ashland County - southwest corner
Rochester Township - west
Brighton Township - northwest corner

No municipalities are located in Huntington Township.

Name and history
Huntington Township was established in 1822, and named after Huntington, Connecticut, the native home of an early settler. Statewide, other Huntington Townships are located in Brown, Gallia, and Ross counties.

Government
The township is governed by a three-member board of trustees, who are elected in November of odd-numbered years to a four-year term beginning on the following January 1. Two are elected in the year after the presidential election and one is elected in the year before it. There is also an elected township fiscal officer, who serves a four-year term beginning on April 1 of the year after the election, which is held in November of the year before the presidential election. Vacancies in the fiscal officership or on the board of trustees are filled by the remaining trustees.

Notable people
 Myron T. Herrick, 42nd governor of Ohio

References

External links

County website

Townships in Lorain County, Ohio
Townships in Ohio